Marcus Morton Robbins (July 25, 1851 – June 21, 1924) served in the United States Army during the American Indian Wars. He received the Medal of Honor.

Robbins was a resident of Elba, Wisconsin. He died at his daughter's home in Pittsfield, Massachusetts on June 21, 1924, and was buried in Pittsfield Cemetery.

Army service
Robbins served as a private in the Sixth U.S. Cavalry, fighting in the American Indian Wars

On April 23, 1875, Robbins and five other soldiers snuck up behind a band of Cheyenne warriors and attacked them from the rear at Sappa Creek in Kansas. He received a Medal of Honor for these actions on November 16, 1876. Several other members of his company also received medals for their role in the battle. Richard Longstreth Tea, Frederick Platten, James Lowthers, Simpson Hornaday, and Peter W. Gardiner made up the rest of the expedition around the Cheyenne lines, and all received the Medal of Honor.  Michael Dawson and James F. Ayers also were a part of the battle, and also were awarded the Medal of Honor.  The engagement was part of the Red River War.

Twentieth-century commentators have questioned the role of the Sixth Cavalry at Sappa Creek, with some calling it a "massacre."

Medal of Honor
His award citation reads:

With 5 other men he waded in mud and water up the creek to a position directly behind an entrenched Cheyenne position, who were using natural bank pits to good advantage against the main column. This surprise attack from the enemy rear broke their resistance.

The medal itself was out of possession of Robbins' family for many years, until it was returned to them in 2009.

See also

List of Medal of Honor recipients
List of Medal of Honor recipients for the Indian Wars

References

External links

People from Elba, Wisconsin
Military personnel from Wisconsin
United States Army Medal of Honor recipients
United States Army soldiers
American military personnel of the Indian Wars
1851 births
1924 deaths
American Indian Wars recipients of the Medal of Honor